Olive Branch High School  may refer to:

Olive Branch High School (Olive Branch, Mississippi)
Olive Branch High School (New Carlisle, Ohio)